Finish the Story  were formed in Evesham, England in 1981. The original members were Nicola Mumford, Garry Smout and Peter Bright (aka This Window). Finish the Story were very much a part of the 'Evesham Scene' which included bands The Photos and The Dancing Did

Formed as a cathartic reaction to the death of Nicola's boyfriend, Stuart Dyke, who was killed in a car crash in 1981. Stuart was the bass player with The Dancing Did . Tim Harrison the singer with The Dancing Did invited Nicola to put her angst into words and music and support his band at their next gig. With only a handful of songs, a home-made video and under-rehearsed, Finish the Story appeared for a one-off gig at The Phoenix Club in Great Malvern (UK) as the support act for The Dancing Did.

In the audience was freelance journalist Mick Mercer, who was there to review the main act for Record Mirror. A review of the same gig appeared in ZigZag (magazine) written by Sara Jones, who said, "Finish the Story's debut gig was better than the second coming of Jesus Christ."

With only a few gigs to their credit, the band headlined in towns and cities like London, Birmingham, Bristol, and Exeter. Also they supported The Cure at Hammersmith Odeon, other bands they have appeared with include Blurt, And Also The Trees. Finish the Story refused to compromise their artistic intensity to a record label which ultimately forced them apart.

Their first release was on Gunfire and Pianos (SITU 17), released by ZigZag/Situation Two.  Also appearing on this album were Psychic TV, Jazz Butcher and All About Eve (band).

Articles 
Clipping of 'one-off' Malvern gig in Record Mirror 8 August 1981 by Mick Mercer
 ZigZag (magazine) clipping of 'one-off' Malvern gig September 1981 by Sara Jones 
Review of gig in Bristol by Dave Massey in Sounds (magazine) 2 July 1983 
Interview in 'Women In Rock' published by The Daily Mirror  1983
Review and interview with the BBC in 2005.  There is a link on this page to an audio clip of the interview.
Collection of a few reviews and quotes.

External links
Band website which includes the early DIY videos shot on  a domestic VHS video camera which were shown before their gigs in 1981 website
List of releases in Europe on Discogs.com 

English rock music groups
1981 establishments in England